The 2009 Longueuil municipal election took place on November 1, 2009, to elect a mayor and city councillors in Longueuil, Quebec, Canada.

Caroline St-Hilaire was elected to her first term as mayor, and her party won 11 of the 26 seats on Longueuil City Council.

Results

Mayor

Councillors

Vieux-Longueuil

Greenfield Park

Saint-Hubert

References

Longueuil
2009